Raphael Jamil Dem (born March 9, 1993) is a German footballer who plays as a defender for VSG Altglienicke.

Personal life
Dem is of Senegalese descent through his father.

References

External links

1993 births
Living people
Footballers from Berlin
German footballers
German people of Senegalese descent
Chemnitzer FC players
Hertha BSC II players
3. Liga players
Association football defenders
21st-century German people